Omorgus batesi is a species of hide beetle in the subfamily Omorginae and the only species in the subgenus Haroldomorgus.

References

batesi
Beetles described in 1872